Titanoceros heliodryas is a species of snout moth described by Edward Meyrick in 1933. It is found in Australia.

References

Moths described in 1933
Epipaschiinae